The Sinjar District or the Shingal District is a district of the Nineveh Governorate. The district seat is the town of Sinjar. The district has two subdistricts, al-Shemal and al-Qayrawan. The district is one of two major population centers for Yazidis, the other being Shekhan District.

History
Sinjar District was created in 1934 by Royal decree.  After the 1935 Yazidi revolt, the district was placed under military control.

The al-Shamal district, originally formed in 1936, was abolished in 1987, and its area was added to Sinjar. Qayrawan was formed as a district in 1977, was also abolished in 1987, and was added to the district. In 1994, al-Shamal and Qayrawan were reformed as a sub-districts.

In 2007, several explosions set off by al-Qaeda in Iraq killed hundreds of Yazidis in Shengal.

In August 2014, the Siege of Mount Sinjar raged between Sunni militants of Islamic State of Iraq and the Levant (ISIL) and the Kurdish Peshmerga, leading to a mass exodus of residents, especially from the Yazidi community, branded by the Islamic State as "devil worshipers", after the Peshmerga was defeated. The New York Times reported that ISIL killed dozens of Yazidi men and forced their women to marry jihadi fighters."
According to Iraqi MP Vian Dakhil, an estimated 6,383 Yazidi women and children were taken as sex slaves by ISIS/ISIL.

According to Kurdish sources, nine Yazidi mass graves had been found by the end of the offensive. Eighteen Yazidi shrines have also been destroyed by ISIL militants since June 2014. As additional graves were found, masked Yazidis retaliated against assumed ISIL collaborators in four Muslim villages in late January 2015 with Sibaya and Chiri attacked on January 25 and Khazuga and Sayer on January 26. PKK, YPG and YPJ joint forces were able to stop additional attacks on two more villages after Peshmerga fled the area.

It was announced on October 17, 2017 that the area had returned to Iraqi government control.

Geography

The district borders and is a crossing point with Syria.
The district is 136 km from Mosul city, the capital of the Nineveh Governorate. The Sinjar Mountains are located in the district.

Economy
The district's economy is primarily based on agriculture with the main crops being barley, figs, wheat, and tobacco. In the villages of  Ain al-Ghazal and Hayali exist oil fields, which were closed because of the Iraq war. Natural gas and heavy minerals exist in the Sinjar Mountains.

Settlements
 Ain al-Ghazal, Sunni
 Bahrava, Yezidi
 Bare, Yezidi
 Borek, Yezidi
 Chiri Yezidi 
 Dohula, Yezidi
 Duguri, Yezidi
 Gir Azêr (also Til Ezer), Yezidi
 Gohbal, Yezidi
 Hayali Yezidi 
 Khana Sor, Yezidi
 Khazuga, Sunni 
 Majnuniyê, Yezidi
 Qayrawan or Qairouan, also called Balij or Bulayj, Sunni
 Sayer, Sunni
 Sîba Şêx Xidir, Yezidi
 Shingal, Yezidi, seat of the district
 Sinone (also Sinuni), Yezidi, seat of Al-Shamal subdistrict
 Sibaya, Sunni
 Solagh, Yezidi
 Wardiyê/Zirafki, Yezidi
 Zorava, Yezidi
 Hardan, Yezidi

others:
 Adîke  ئادیکە
 Dihil
 Kersê کەرسێ 
 Koço
 Rifeyi
 Sinun
 Gura / Isdêra Şimalê 
 Telezêr
 Tel Qeseb
 Tel Benat
 Qabusî
 Xalabazar

See also 

Yazidi genocide
Kurdification & Arabization
List of Yazidi holy places
List of Yazidi settlements

References

Districts of Nineveh Governorate